The 1985 All-Big Eight Conference football team consists of American football players chosen by various organizations for All-Big Eight Conference teams for the 1985 NCAA Division I-A football season.  The selectors for the 1985 season included the Associated Press (AP) and United Press International (UPI).

Offensive selections

Quarterbacks
 Jamelle Holieway, Oklahoma (AP-1; UPI-1)
 Mike Norseth, Kansas (AP-2; UPI-2)

Running backs
 Thurman Thomas, Oklahoma State (AP-1; UPI-1)
 Doug DuBose, Nebraska (AP-1; UPI-1)
 Tom Rathman, Nebraska (AP-1; UPI-2)
 Darrell Wallace, Missouri (AP-2; UPI-2)
 Lydell Carr, Oklahoma (AP-2)

Tight ends
 Keith Jackson, Oklahoma (AP-1; UPI-1)
 Jeff Wodka, Iowa State (AP-2; UPI-2)

Wide receivers
 Richard Estell, Kansas (AP-1; UPI-1)
 Herbert Johnson, Missouri (AP-2; UPI-1)
 Gerald Alphin, Kansas State (AP-2; UPI-2)
 Bobby Riley, Oklahoma State (UPI-2)

Centers
 Bill Lewis, Nebraska (AP-1; UPI-1)
 Eric Coyle, Colorado (AP-2; UPI-2)

Guards
 Brian Blankenship, Nebraska (AP-1; UPI-1)
 Mark Hutson, Oklahoma (AP-1; UPI-2)
 Junior Ili, Colorado (AP-2; UPI-2)
 Anthony Phillips, Oklahoma (AP-2; UPI-1)

Tackles
 Paul Blair, Oklahoma State (AP-1; UPI-1)
 John Clay, Missouri (AP-1; UPI-1)
 Jim Davis, Kansas (UPI-2)
 Jim Webb, Colorado (UPI-2)
 Eric Pope, Oklahoma (AP-2)
 Tim Roth, Nebraska (AP-2)

Defensive selections

Defensive ends
 Kevin Murphy, Oklahoma (AP-1; UPI-1)
 Darrell Reed, Oklahoma (AP-1; UPI-1)
 Jim Luebbers, Iowa State (AP-2; UPI-2)
 Kevin Humphrey, Kansas State (AP-2)
 Dan McMillen, Colorado (UPI-2)

Defensive Tackles
 Leslie O'Neal, Oklahoma State (AP-1; UPI-1)
 Tony Casillas, Oklahoma (AP-1; UPI-1)
 Jim Skow, Nebraska (AP-1; UPI-1)
 Danny Noonan, Nebraska (AP-2; UPI-2)
 John Washington, Oklahoma State (AP-2; UPI-2)
 Dick Chapura, Missouri (AP-2)
 Chris Spachman, Nebraska (UPI-2)

Linebackers
 Brian Bosworth, Oklahoma (AP-1; UPI-1)
 Willie Pless, Kansas (AP-1; UPI-1)
 Marc Munford, Nebraska (AP-1; UPI-2)
 Barry Remington, Colorado (AP-2; UPI-2)
 Jeff Brasswell, Iowa State (AP-2)

Defensive backs
 Barton Hundley, Kansas State (AP-1; UPI-1)
 Mark Moore, Oklahoma State (AP-1; UPI-1)
 Mike Hudson, Oklahoma State (AP-1; UPI-1)
 Mickey Pruitt, Colorado (AP-2; UPI-1)
 Erik McMillan, Missouri (AP-2; UPI-2)
 Brian Washington, Nebraska (AP-2; UPI-2)
 Sonny Brown, Oklahoma (UPI-2)
 Rickey Dixon, Oklahoma (AP-2)
 Anthony Mayze, Iowa State (UPI-2)

Special teams

Place-kicker
 Dale Klein, Nebraska (AP-1; UPI-1)
 Jeff Johnson, Kansas (AP-2)
 Tom Whelihan, Missouri (UPI-2)

Punter
 Barry Helton, Colorado (AP-1; UPI-1)
 Mike Winchester, Oklahoma (UPI-2)

Key

AP = Associated Press
UPI = United Press International

See also
 1985 College Football All-America Team

References

All-Big Seven Conference football team
All-Big Eight Conference football teams